The United States Air Force has many bands that perform entertainment and public affairs functions. In mid-2012, there were 11 Air National Guard bands containing a total of 350 musicians.  Six bands will be inactivated.

Current military bands

Active duty bands
United States Air Force Band
The Airmen of Note
United States Air Force Academy Band
United States Air Force Band of Flight (661st Air Force Band)
United States Air Force Band of the Golden West (523rd Air Force Band)
United States Air Force Band of Mid-America
United States Air Force Band of the Pacific
United States Air Force Band of Pacific-Asia
United States Air Force Band of Pacific-Hawaii
United States Air Force Band of the West (539th Air Force Band)
United States Air Force Heartland of America Band (702nd Air Force Band)
United States Air Force Heritage of America Band (564th Air Force Band)
United States Air Forces in Europe Band (686th Air Force Band)
United States Air Forces Central Command Band

National Guard Bands
Air National Guard Band of the Midwest (566th Air Force Band)
Air National Guard Band of the Northeast (567th Air Force Band)
Air National Guard Band of the South (530th Air Force Band)
Air National Guard Band of the Southwest (562nd Air Force Band)
Air National Guard Band of the West Coast (561st Air Force Band)
Air National Guard Band of the West Coast

Other bands
United States Air Force Academy Drum and Bugle Corps
United States Air Force Academy Alumni Drum and Bugle Corps

Former bands

Army Air Force Bands
3rd Air Force Band
16th Air Force Band
501st Air Force Band
523rd Air Force Band (March AFB, CA)
524th Air Force Band (Sheppard AFB, TX))
525th Air Force Band (Sheppard AFB/Cannon AFB, TX)
526th Air Force Band (Sheppard AFB, TX)
547th Air Force Band (North Malir, Pakistan)
548th Air Force Band (Hollandia, New Guinea)
640th Army Air Forces Band
511th Army Air Force Band (Gulfport, MS)

Other bands
United States Air Force Band of Liberty (541st Air Force Band)
WAF Band (543rd Air Force Band)
United States Air Force Pipe Band
Band of the United States Air Force Reserve (581st Air Force Band), disbanded in 2012
502nd Air Force Band (Keesler AFB, MS)
505th Air Force Band (Chanute AFB, IL)
509th Air Force Band (Webb AFB, TX
515th Air Force Band (Bryan AFB, TX)
521st Air Force Band (F.E. Warren AFB, WY)
522nd Air Force Band (Ramey AFB, Puerto Rico)
523rd Air Force Band (March AFB, CA)
528th Air Force Band (Scott AFB, IL)
538th Air Force Band (Hunter AFB, GA)
539th Air Force Band
Empire Band of The Air Force (544th Air Force Band)
545th Air Force Band (Lackland AFB, TX)
549th Air Force Band (Hill AFB, UT)
552nd Air Force Band (Roslyn ANG Station, NY)
573rd Air Force Band (Hamilton AFB, CA)
579th Air Force Band (Stewart AFB, NY)
583rd Air Force Band
589th Air Force Band
590th Air Force Band (McGuire AFB, NJ)
591st Air Force Band
600th Air Force Band
604th Air Force Band
626th Air Force Band
648th Air Force Band
683rd Air Force Band
695th Air Force Band
Strategic Air Command Band (702nd Air Force Band)
724th Air Force Band
730th Air Force Band
745th Air Force Band (Barksdale AFB, LA)
746th Air Force Band
748th Air Force Band
751st Air Force Band
753rd Air Force Band
774th Air Force Band (Ladd AFB, AK)
775th Air Force Band
776th Air Force Band
Air National Guard Band of the Central States (571st Air Force Band), under the 131st Bomb Wing
Air National Guard Band of the Great Lakes "Triple Nickel" (555th Air Force Band)
Air National Guard Band of the Gulf Coast (531st Air Force Band)
Air National Guard Band of the Mid-Atlantic (553rd Air Force Band)
Air National Guard Band of the Northwest (560th Air Force Band)
Air National Guard Band of the Smoky Mountains (572nd Air Force Band)

See also 
United States military bands
Fleet Band Activities

References

External links
Air Force Bands Program - Bands
Afmusic.org
Air Force bands program restructure 2013
Air Force Musicians Association

Bands
.